Weedville is an unincorporated community and census-designated place in Jay Township, Elk County, Pennsylvania, United States. As of the 2010 census, the population was 542.

Weedville is located in the southern part of Jay Township, in southeastern Elk County, in the valley of the Bennett Branch Sinnemahoning Creek, a tributary of the West Branch Susquehanna River. It is bordered to the northwest by Byrnedale and to the southwest by Force. Pennsylvania Route 255 passes through the community, leading north  to St. Marys and southwest  to DuBois. Pennsylvania Route 555 branches off PA 255 in the center of Weedville, leading northeast then east down the Bennett Branch valley  to Driftwood.

References

Census-designated places in Pennsylvania
Census-designated places in Elk County, Pennsylvania